Vernia is the eighth solo studio album by American rapper and record producer Erick Sermon. It was released on April 19, 2019 via Def Squad Records. Together with Sermon, production was handled by eight record producers, including DJ Battlecat, Rockwilder and Ty Fyffe. The album features guest appearances from AZ, Big K.R.I.T., David Banner, Da YoungFellaz, Devin the Dude, Kaelyn Kastle, Keith Murray, Nature, No Malice, N.O.R.E., Raekwon, Ricco Barrino, RJ Payne, Styles P, Shaquille O'Neal, Too $hort, TryBishop, Xzibit, and Yummy.

On April 16, 2019, Sermon released a Boogeyman-produced song "My Style".

Track listing
This track listing has been adapted from iTunes.

References

External links
Vernia on Bandcamp

2019 albums
Erick Sermon albums
Albums produced by Ty Fyffe
Albums produced by Rockwilder
Albums produced by Erick Sermon
Albums produced by Battlecat (producer)